Tararn Wala (Chak 237 GB) (in Urdu تارڑانوالہ ) is a large size village of Jaranwala Tehsil, Punjab, Pakistan. This village is on Gugera Branch Canal. Punjabi is the native spoken language, and Urdu is also widely used. Major castes in this village include the Gurjar, Arain, Rajput, and Tarar. Adjacent village is Chak 236 GB Kilanwala

References

External links
Govt. Primary School Chak 237 Gb Jaranwala, Faisalabad
Faisalabad District UC List and Area Names فیصل آباد ضلع کونسل

Villages in Faisalabad District